Thar (ثار) is one of the governorates in Najran Region, Saudi Arabia.

References 

Populated places in Najran Province
Governorates of Saudi Arabia